Northern Maine Community College is a public community college in Presque Isle, Maine.  It is part of the Maine Community College System. The  campus was founded in 1961 on the grounds of the former Presque Isle Air Force Base.

Academics
The college awards the Associate's degree in a variety of subjects.  The college is split into four departments: Arts & Sciences, Business Technology, Nursing & Allied Health, Trade & Technical.

Arts & Sciences
This department has programs in Liberal Studies and Early Childhood Education.

Business Technology
This department is accredited by the Association of Collegiate Business Schools and Programs (ACBSP).

Nursing & Allied Health
The associate degree nursing program is accredited by the National League for Nursing Accrediting Commission, Inc.

Sports
NMCC Falcons are a United States Collegiate Athletic Association (USCAA) school that compete in the Northern Division of the Yankee Small College Conference.  The school competes in golf, soccer, men's and women's basketball, ice hockey, and skiing.

Notable people
 Edward Perrin Edmunds, state legislator who helped found institution

References

External links
 Official website

Educational institutions established in 1961
Community colleges in Maine
Universities and colleges in Aroostook County, Maine
Presque Isle, Maine
USCAA member institutions
1961 establishments in Maine